Phenomenology in architecture can be understood as a discursive and realist attempt to understand and embody the philosophical insights of phenomenology.

According to Dan Zahavi:Phenomenology shares the conviction that the critical stance proper to philosophy requires a move away from a straightforward metaphysical or empirical investigation of objects, to an investigation of the very framework of meaning and intelligibility that makes any such straightforward investigation possible in the first place. It precisely asks how something like objectivity is possible in the first place. Phenomenology has also made important contributions to most areas of philosophy. Contemporary phenomenology is a somewhat heterogeneous field.The contributions of phenomenology in architecture are among the most significant and lasting in architecture, due to architecture's direct involvement with experience.

Overview
The phenomenology of architecture is the philosophical study of architecture. In contrast, architectural phenomenology is a movement within architecture beginning in the 1950s, reaching a wide audience in the late 1970s and 1980s, and continuing until today. Architectural phenomenology, with its emphasis on human experience, background, intention and historical reflection, interpretation and poetic and ethical considerations stood in sharp contrast to the anti-historicism of postwar modernism and the pastiche of postmodernism. It was never a movement proper because it did not have an immediate aesthetic associated with it, thus is should be understood as more of an orientation to thinking and making.

Historical development
American architects first started seriously studying phenomenology at Princeton University in the 1950s under Prof. Jean Labatut, whose student Charles W. Moore was the first to write a PhD dissertation, titled Water and Architecture (1958), that drew heavily on the philosophy of Gaston Bachelard. In Europe, Milanese architect Ernesto Nathan Rogers, through his influential editorship of the journal Casabella Continuità helped to advance architectural phenomenology in Europe. He collaborated with philosopher Enzo Paci, and influenced a generation of young architects including Vittorio Gregotti and Aldo Rossi. By the 1970s, the Norwegian architect, theorist and historian Christian Norberg-Schulz achieved international acclaim with his book "Genius Loci: Towards a Phenomenology of Architecture" (1979), which was markedly influenced by Martin Heidegger's hermeneutic ontology.  Christian Norberg-Schulz was, for many architecture students of the 1980s, an important reference in architectural phenomenology, especially because the combination of texts and images in his books provided readily accessible explanations for how a phenomenological approach to architecture could be translated into designs. Norberg-Schulz spawned a wide following, including his successor at the Oslo School of Architecture, Thomas Thiis-Evensen. In the 1970s, the School of Comparative Studies at the University of Essex, under the direction of Dalibor Vesely and Joseph Rykwert, was the breeding ground for a generation of architectural phenomenologists, which included David Leatherbarrow, professor of architecture at the University of Pennsylvania, Alberto Pérez-Gómez, professor of architectural history and theory at McGill University, the architect Daniel Libeskind. In the 1980s, the phenomenological approach to architecture was continued and further developed by Vesely and his colleague Peter Carl in their research and teaching at the Department of Architecture at the University of Cambridge. As architectural phenomenology became established in academia, professors developed theory seminars that tried to expand the movement's range of ideas beyond Gaston Bachelard, and Martin Heidegger, to include Edmund Husserl, Maurice Merleau-Ponty, Hans-Georg Gadamer Hannah Arendt and an ever wider group of theorists whose modes of thinking bordered on phenomenology, such as Gilles Deleuze, Henri Bergson, Paul Virilio, Charles Taylor, Hubert Dreyfus and Edward S. Casey.

The phenomenon of dwelling was one research theme in architectural phenomenology. Much of the way it was understood in architecture was shaped by the later thought of Martin Heidegger as set in his influential essay: "Building Dwelling Thinking." He links dwelling to what he refers as the "gathering of the fourfold," namely the regions of being as entailed by the phenomena of: "the saving of earth, the reception of sky (heavens), the initiation of mortals into their death, and the awaiting/remembering of divinities." The essence of dwelling is not architectural, per se, in the same manner that the essence of technology for him is not technological per se.

Influence in practice
Prominent architects, such as Daniel Libeskind, Steven Holl, and Peter Zumthor were described by Juhani Pallasmaa as current practitioners of the phenomenology of architecture.

Notable architects
Notable architects and scholars of architecture who are associated with architectural phenomenology include:

 Nader El-Bizri
 Kenneth Frampton
 Marco Frascari
 Vittorio Gregotti
 Steven Holl
 David Leatherbarrow
 Daniel Libeskind
 Charles W. Moore
 Christian Norberg-Schulz
 Mohsen Mostafavi 
 Juhani Pallasmaa
 Alberto Pérez-Gómez
 Ernesto Nathan Rogers
 Joseph Rykwert
 Dalibor Vesely
 Peter Zumthor

See also
 Architectural theory
 Atmosphere (architecture and spatial design)
 Critical Regionalism 
 Khôra

References

Bibliography 
Major Works

 Gaston Bachelard, 1969 [1957]. The Poetics of Space, trans. Maria Jolas. Boston: Beacon Press.
 Kent Bloomer and Charles Moore, 1977. Body, Memory and Architecture. New Haven: Yale University Press.
 Kenneth Frampton, 1974. "On Reading Heidegger." Oppositions 4 (October 1974), unpaginated.
 Karsten Harries, 1980.  “The Dream of the Complete Building.”  Perspecta: The Yale Journal of Architecture 17: 36-43.
 Karsten Harries, 1982. “Building and the Terror of Time.” Perspecta: The Yale Journal of Architecture 19: 59-69.
 Karsten Harries, 1997. The Ethical Function of Architecture. Cambridge, Massachusetts: MIT Press.
 Martin Heidegger, 1971 [1927]. Poetry, Language, Thought, trans. Albert Hofstadter. New York: Harper & Row.
 Martin Heidegger, 1973. “Art and Space”, trans. Charles Siebert. Man and World, 1973, Fall 6: 3–8.
 Steven Holl, Juhani Pallasmaa, and Alberto Pérèz-Gomez, 1994. Questions of Perception: Phenomenology of Architecture. A&U Special Issue, July 1994.
 Christian Norberg-Schulz, 1971. Existence, Space and Architecture. New York: Praeger.
 Christian Norberg-Schulz, 1976. “The Phenomenon of Space.” Architectural Association Quarterly 8, no. 4: 3-10.
 Christian Norberg-Schulz, 1980. Genius Loci: Towards a Phenomenology of Architecture. New York: Rizzoli.
 Christian Norberg-Schulz, 1983. “Heidegger’s Thinking on Architecture.” Perspecta: The Yale Architectural Journal 20: 61-68.
 Christian Norberg-Schulz, 1985 [1984]. The Concept of Dwelling: On the Way to Figurative Architecture. New York: Electa/Rizzoli.
 Juhani Pallasmaa, 1986. “The Geometry of Feeling: A Look at the Phenomenology of Architecture.” Skala: Nordic Journal of Architecture and Art 4: 22-25.
Juhani Pallasmaa, 1996. The Eyes of the Skin: Architecture and the Senses. New York: Wiley.
 Fred Rush, 2009. On Architecture. London & New York: Routledge.
 M. Reza Shirazi, 2014. Towards an Articulated Phenomenological Interpretation of Architecture: Phenomenal Phenomenology. London: Routledge.
Thomas Thiis-Evensen, 1987. Archetypes in Architecture. Oxford: Oxford University Press.
 Dalibor Vesely, 1988. “On the Relevance of Phenomenology.”  Pratt Journal of Architecture 2: 59-62.
 Pierre von Meiss, 1990 [1986]. Elements of Architecture: From Form to Place. London, E & FN Spon.

Further Reading
 Dennis Pohl, 2018, "Heidegger's Architects," in: Environmental & Architectural Phenomenology, Vol. 29, No. 1:19–20.
 Nader El-Bizri, 2011. "Being at Home Among Things: Heidegger's Reflections on Dwelling." Environment, Space, Place, Vol. 3:47–71.
Nader El-Bizri, 2015. "On Dwelling: Heideggerian Allusions to Architectural Phenomenology." Studia UBB Philosophia 60: 5–30.
 Benoît Jacquet & Vincent Giraud, eds., 2012. From the Things Themselves: Architecture and Phenomenology. Kyoto and Paris: Kyoto University Press and Ecole française d'Extrême-Orient.  
 Maurice Merleau-Ponty, 1962 [1945]. The Phenomenology of Perception, trans. Colin Smith. New York: Humanities Press.
Mohsen Mostafavi and David Leatherbarrow, 1993. On Weathering: The Life of Buildings in Time. Cambridge, Massachusetts: MIT Press.
 Kate Nesbitt, ed., 1996. Theorizing a New Agenda for Architecture: An Anthology of Architectural Theory 1965-1995. New York: Princeton Architectural Press.
 Christian Norberg-Schulz, 1965. Intentions in Architecture. Cambridge, Massachusetts: MIT Press.
 Christian Norberg-Schulz, 1988. Architecture: Meaning and Place. New York: Rizzoli.
 Alberto Pérez-Gómez, 1983. Architecture and the Crisis of Modern Science. Cambridge, Massachusetts: MIT Press.
 Steen Eiler Rasmussen, 1959. Experiencing Architecture. Cambridge, Massachusetts: MIT Press.
 David Seamon & Robert Mugerauer eds.,1985. Dwelling, Place & Environment: Towards a Phenomenology of Person and World. Dordrecht, Netherlands: Martinus Nijhoff.
 Adam Sharr, 2007. Heidegger for Architects. London and New York: Routledge.
 Dalibor Vesely, 2004. Architecture in the Age of Divided Representation: The Question of Creativity in the Shadow of Production. Cambridge, Massachusetts: MIT Press.

Architectural theory
+
+
Deconstructivism
Phenomenological methodology